The 1989 Football League Cup Final was a football match played on 9 April 1989 between Nottingham Forest and the 1988 League Cup winners, Luton Town at Wembley Stadium. Nottingham Forest claimed victory in the 29th League Cup final with a 3–1 victory. Luton opened the scoring in the first half with a header from Mick Harford, while Forest's Lee Chapman had a goal disallowed at the other end. In the second half Forest took control and equalised with a penalty by Nigel Clough. Soon after, Tommy Gaynor provided a cross for Neil Webb to control and slot into the Luton net. Clough completed the scoring with a low drilled shot from just outside the penalty area. It was Forest's third victory in this competition, and currently the last time Luton have appeared in either domestic cup final.

Match details

Road to Wembley
Luton

Luton 1–1 Burnley (R Johnson) 2nd Round 1st Leg

Burnley 0–1 Luton (R Hill) 2nd Round 2nd Leg

Leeds 0–2 Luton (D Wilson, K Black) 3rd Round

Luton 3–1 Manchester City (R Wegerle 2, Oldfield) 4th Round

Luton 1–1 Southampton (M Harford) 5th Round

Southampton 1–2 Luton (M Harford, R Hill) 5th Round Replay

West Ham United 0–3 Luton (M Harford, R Wegerle, D Wilson) Semi-final 1st Leg

Luton 2–0 West Ham United (M Harford, R Wegerle) Semi-final 2nd Leg

References
Match report at the Sporting Chronicle

EFL Cup Finals
League Cup Final 1989
League Cup Final 1989
1988–89 Football League
Football League Cup Final
1989 in London